Jurjen Bosch (born 14 December 1985) is a Dutch retired professional football player who played as a forward for Dutch club SC Cambuur.

Club career
In his younger years, he played for local soccer club Wykels Hallum.

Bosch made his professional debut for Cambuur on 21 December 2007 in an Eerste Divisie match against Go Ahead Eagles. He was released by the club in 2009.

He returned to amateur football after two seasons with Cambuur and played for Hoofdklasse club PKC'83 and Topklasse side ONS Boso Sneek. In summer 2015 he joined childhood club Wykels Hallum.

References

1985 births
Living people
People from Ferwerderadiel
Footballers from Friesland
Association football forwards
Dutch footballers
SC Cambuur players
Eerste Divisie players
Derde Divisie players
ONS Sneek players